Kodassery  is a village in Thrissur district in the state of Kerala, India.

Demographics
 India census, Kodassery had a population of 12083 with 6044 males and 6039 females. Kodassery village in kerala is only village in India where 100% reservation has been given to women in gram panchayats

References

Villages in Thrissur district